Christian Frederik Bayer (6 July 1841  22 November 1933) was a Danish illustrator. He is remembered for his topographical drawings and watercolours from Copenhagen, many of which were featured on postcards.

Early life and education
Christian Bayer was born in Copenhagen, the son of painter Johan Bayer and Sophie Dauny. He apprenticed first under bookseller and publisher F. H. Eibe in 1854-60 and then under Xylograoher A. C. F. Flinch in 1860-63. He also trained for half a year in  Henneberg and Rosenstand's xylographic workshop and in 1863 while studying painting under Johannes Exner. He later graduated from the Technical Institute in Copenhagen.

Career
Bayer's artistic output remained a side occupation. He worked for the bank Bikuben for many years. He created a vast number of topographical drawings and watercolours from Copenhagen, Many of them featured celebrities. He also created many portraits.

Bayer's works were for instance featured on a series of 32 postcards from Alex. Vincents Kunstforlag which were both available in black-and-white and colours.

References 

19th-century Danish illustrators
20th-century Danish illustrators
Artists from Copenhagen
1841 births
1933 deaths